Robbe Ghys (born 11 January 1997) is a Belgian road and track cyclist, who currently rides for UCI WorldTeam .

As a junior, Ghys participated at the 2015 UCI Road World Championships in the Men's junior road race. He competed on the track at the 2016 UEC European Track Championships in the team pursuit and elimination race events. In 2018 he became European Champion in the Madison, together with Kenny De Ketele.

Major results

Road

2016
 3rd Grand Prix des Marbriers
 5th Kernen Omloop Echt-Susteren
 6th Antwerpse Havenpijl
2017
 3rd Omloop Het Nieuwsblad Beloften
 4th Time trial, National Under–23 Championships
 4th Paris–Roubaix Espoirs
 8th Grand Prix des Marbriers
2018
 3rd Overall An Post Ras
1st  Young rider classification
1st Stage 8
 9th Grand Prix Criquielion
2021
 1st Stage 1 Tour of Belgium
2022
 9th Grand Prix de Denain

Track

2018
 1st  Madison (with Kenny De Ketele), UEC European Championships
 2nd Six Days of Ghent (with Kenny De Ketele)
2019
 3rd  Madison (with Kenny De Ketele), UCI World Championships
2021
 1st Six Days of Ghent (with Kenny De Ketele)
 3rd  Madison (with Kenny De Ketele), UCI World Championships
2022
 1st Six Days of Ghent (with Lindsay De Vylder)
 UEC European Championships
2nd  Points race
3rd  Madison (with Fabio Van Den Bossche)

References

External links

1997 births
Living people
Belgian male cyclists
Belgian track cyclists
Sportspeople from Hasselt
Cyclists from Limburg (Belgium)
Olympic cyclists of Belgium
Cyclists at the 2020 Summer Olympics